The Birkin Baronetcy, of Ruddington Grange in the parish of Ruddington in the County of Nottingham, is a title in the Baronetage of the United Kingdom. It was created on 25 July 1905 for the businessman Thomas Isaac Birkin. He was a lace manufacturer, director of the Great Northern Railway and the Mercantile Steamship Company. His grandson, the 3rd Baronet, was a racing driver. He died without male issue and was succeeded by his uncle, the fourth Baronet. his sons pre-deceased him and he was succeeded by his nephew, the fifth Baronet. As of 2007 the title is held by the latter's son, the sixth Baronet, who succeeded in 1985.

Birkin baronets, of Ruddington Grange (1905)
Sir Thomas Isaac Birkin, 1st Baronet (1831–1922)
Sir Thomas Stanley Birkin, 2nd Baronet (1857–1931)
Lieutenant Thomas Richard Chetwynd Birkin (1895–1917)
Sir Henry Ralph Stanley "Tim" Birkin, 3rd Baronet (1896–1933)
Charles Archibald Cecil Birkin (1905–1927)
Sir Alexander Russell Birkin, 4th Baronet (1861–1942)
Lt.-Col. Richard Leslie Birkin (1863–1936)
Colonel Charles Wilfred Birkin (1865–1932)
Sir Charles Lloyd Birkin, 5th Baronet (1907–1985)
Sir John Christian William Birkin, 6th Baronet (b. 1953)

The heir apparent to the baronetcy is the 6th Baronet's eldest son, Benjamin Charles Birkin (b. 1995)

Other notable family members
 Archie Birkin (1905–1927), racing car driver; brother of the 3rd Baronet
 Freda Dudley Ward born Winifred May Birkin (1894–1983), royal mistress, granddaughter of the first baronet
 Jane Birkin (b. 1946), actress; great-granddaughter of the first baronet
 Andrew Birkin (b. 1945), actor, screenwriter, and director; brother of Jane Birkin
 David Tristan Birkin (b. 1977), actor, son of Andrew Birkin
 Anno Birkin (1980–2001), poet and musician, son of Andrew Birkin

Notes

References

Birkin